Antal Megyerdi (5 December 1939 – 10 March 2013) was a Hungarian cyclist. He was born in Budapest, his profession was a Publisher.  He competed at the 1964 Summer Olympics in the individual road race and finished in 47th place. In 1960 he won the Tour de Slovaquie, and in 1966 one stage of the Peace Race.

References 

1939 births
2013 deaths
Cyclists at the 1964 Summer Olympics
Olympic cyclists of Hungary
Hungarian male cyclists
Cyclists from Budapest